Guer is a commune in the Morbihan department in Brittany in north-western France.

It is located at the edge of the famous Brocéliande Forest, which is the setting of the Round Table novels in Brittany.

Camp Coëtquidan (Camp de Coëtquidan) is located in Guer and comprises three military educational facilities:

 École Spéciale Militaire de Saint-Cyr, France's foremost military academy dedicated to the training of Army officers through direct recruitment;
 École militaire interarmes (inter-services military school), for non-commissioned officers; and
 École Militaire du Corps Technique et Administratif (military school of the technical and administrative corps).

Demographics
Inhabitants of Guer are called Guerrois.

See also
 Communes of the Morbihan department

References

External links
 
 Official site 
 
 Mayors of Morbihan Association 

Communes of Morbihan